Yuquan is a town in Tianzhen County, Shanxi province, China. , it administers the following 12 residential neighborhoods and 12 villages:
Neighborhoods
Xingfuli Community
Hepingli Community
Ping'anli Community
Dongfengli Community
Tuanjieli Community
Chaoyangli Community
Qianjinli Community
Nanyuanli Community
Xinhuali Community
Yingbinli Community
Guangmingli Community
Wangjiale Yiminxinqu Community

Villages
Dongbeijie Village
Xinanjie Village
Xibeijie Village
Dongnanjie Village
Nanyuanzi Village
Tangbali Village
Sanlitun Village
Hutuodian Village
Shijiazhuang Village
Gejiatun Village
Baojiatun Village
Lijiazhuang Village

References

Township-level divisions of Shanxi
Tianzhen County